Haze machines, or haze generators (commonly referred to as hazers), are effects machines similar to fog machines, designed to produce an unobtrusive, homogeneous clouds suspended in the air intended primarily to make light beams visible or create a subtle diffusion.

Properties

Unlike theatrical fog, which is typically intended to be dense and/or opaque, haze is generally very light and subtle.  These properties allow a venue to be filled with haze prior to or during an event without creating an overtly distracting cloud. Haze typically has a substantially longer persistence ("hang time") than conventional theatrical fog.  While conventional fog will hang in the air for several minutes, a haze effect filling the same volume of space can last upwards of an hour to several hours or more, depending on the size of the venue and the amount of ventilation.

The fluid used in haze machines to generate the effects are either oil or water-based.  Most oil-based haze fluids use a mineral oil base, while water-based fluids use either a propylene glycol or glycerol base.  Although both formulations of fluid are referred to as haze fluid, the different formulations are neither compatible nor interchangeable.  Propylene glycol/water haze fluid is sometimes referred to as "water based haze" to avoid ambiguity. Describing the fluid as "glycol" might cause stagehands to use automotive antifreeze, which contains ethylene glycol, and unlike propylene glycol, must not be used for this purpose because of its toxicity.

Technology

Crackers
Crackers (also known as "oil crackers") were first developed in the 1960s. The fluid is usually, though not always, refined mineral oil.  Crackers work by use of a spray pump powered either by electricity or compressed CO2 passing through a dispersion head into a fluid reservoir.  The compressed air aerosols the fluid, dispersing fine droplets.  Because the haze is mechanically generated, this type of machine does not require any warm up time.

Pump spray
Pump spray haze machines use electricity or compressed CO2 to power a spray pump connected to a mixing valve, which draws in and atomizes the fluid.

Pump hazers also includes machines which function in the same manner as a fog machine, pumping fluid into a heated chamber where it is vapourized to produce a cloud.  Hazers which heat fluid to create an atmospheric effect only use mixtures of water and glycol or glycerine.  Spray hazers which atomize fluid can use either a water-based or mineral oil fluid.

Aerosol
Smaller volumes of haze can also be generated from aerosol canisters containing mineral oil under pressure.  Although to the density of haze generated and the volume of space that can be filled is significantly smaller than that of a haze machine, aerosol canisters have the advantages of portability, no requirements for electricity and finer control over the volume of haze generated.

Ultrasonic
Ultrasonic haze machines use transducers submerged in a reservoir of fluid to create atmospheric effects.  Although less common than some of the other technologies used to produce haze, ultrasonic hazers are promoted as generating their effects with much less noise than other technologies.

Faze machines
Faze machines, or fazers, can also be used to produce a haze-like effect. These machines are typically fog machines with a fan built in front to disperse the output, creating a haze-like effect.

Fire detection
Although the atmospheric effect created by hazers produces a significantly smaller particle size, around one micrometre (um), compared to the effect generated by a fog machine (hence the finer composition of the "cloud"), the size of particle and effect varies by manufactures and type of fluid used. Because of this, haze is far less likely to set off fire alarms than fog machines or larger smoke particles.

See also
Theatrical smoke and fog
Fog machine

References

Entertainment Services & Technology Association (2005). Introduction to Modern Atmospheric Effects, 4th Edition., The ESTA Foundation.
Learn Stage Lighting (2013). "Hazers - Oil or Water Based?", LearnStageLighting.com Oil Or Water Based

Stagecraft
Special effects